Latu Makaafi, also spelt as Latu Maka'afi, (born 1982) is a Tongan rugby union flanker and Number 8 who plays for Hull having previously been at Coventry.

Rugby career 
Makaafi started playing rugby in England in 2000 when he started playing for Bradford & Bingley RFC. In 2006, he signed for London 2 South club Jersey Reds, becoming the first professional player for Jersey after receiving a work permit from the States of Jersey Customs and Immigration Service. In 2008, Makaafi signed for Hull. In October 2008, he was suspended from playing rugby for 8 weeks by the Yorkshire Rugby Football Union after being sent off for punching. In 2009, Makaafi signed for Wharfedale R.U.F.C. In 2011, he left Wharfedale for Doncaster Knights. In leaving Wharfedale Makaafi recommended that fellow Tongan Talite Vaioleti would replace him at Wharfedale. In 2012, Makaafi moved to fellow RFU Championship team Rotherham Titans for the 2012–13 RFU Championship season as part of a mass exodus of players from Doncaster Knights. During his time at Rotherham Titans, Makaafi played as a guest player at his old club, Bradford & Bingley for a match between a Bradford Salem Select XV and Bradford Grammar School. In 2013, it was announced that Makaafi would return to Jersey for their 2013-14 season.
Following a season at Jersey it was announced that Latu would be returning to Doncaster for the 2014-15 season.
Late in the 2016-2017 season, it was announced by Coventry Rugby that he had signed for them for the 2017-2018 season from Doncaster.

International career
Makaafi has represented Tonga at a number of levels. He has represented the Tonga national under-20 rugby union team. He has also been capped by the Tonga national rugby union team once against Fiji at the 2003 Rugby World Cup.

Honours 
Bradford & Bingley
North Division 2 East champions: 2002-03 
North Division 1 champions: 2003-04
National Division 3 North champions: 2005-06

Hull
National League 3 north v midlands promotion playoff winners: 2008-09

Wharfedale
Yorkshire Cup winners: 2010-11

References 

1982 births
Bradford RFC players
Coventry R.F.C. players
Doncaster Knights players
Jersey Reds players
Living people
People from Haʻapai
Place of birth missing (living people)
Rotherham Titans players
Rugby union flankers
Rugby union number eights
Tonga international rugby union players
Tongan rugby union players
Wharfedale R.U.F.C. players